Carl David Säfwenberg (1 October 1896 – 31 July 1957) was a Swedish ice hockey player who competed in the 1920 Summer Olympics. In 1920 he was a member of the Swedish ice hockey team which finished fourth in the Summer Olympics tournament. He played one match and scored one goal. David Säfwenberg was brother of Sven Säfwenberg.

References

External links
 
profile

1896 births
1957 deaths
Ice hockey players at the 1920 Summer Olympics
Olympic ice hockey players of Sweden
Swedish ice hockey players